Teater Ibsen (from 1975 to 1991 Telemark Teater) is a theatre in Skien in Vestfold og Telemark, Norway. The theatre was established in 1975 as Telemark Teater, and changed its name to Teater Ibsen in 1991. The theatre serves as regional theatre for the counties of Telemark and Vestfold. From 1986 to 2010 the theatre played at Festiviteten in Skien, and relocated to a former industrial site at Klosterøya in Skien in 2011. Anders T. Andersen was appointed artistical director from 2010.

References

External links
Teater Ibsen website

Skien
Buildings and structures in Skien
Culture in Vestfold og Telemark
Tourist attractions in Vestfold og Telemark
Skien
1975 establishments in Norway